Eureka Township is a charter township of Montcalm County in the U.S. state of Michigan.  The population was 3,271 at the 2000 census.

The city of Greenville is within the township, and the Greenville post office, with ZIP code 48838, also serves all of Eureka Township.  Eureka Township was established in 1850.

Geography

Demographics
As of the census of 2000, there were 3,271 people, 1,179 households, and 929 families residing in the township. The racial makeup of the township was 96.36% White, 0.15% African American, 0.55% Native American, 0.43% Asian, 1.35% from other races, and 1.16% from two or more races. Hispanic or Latino of any race were 3.15% of the population.

There were 1,179 households, out of which 37.4% had children under the age of 18 living with them, 68.4% were married couples living together, 6.5% had a female householder with no husband present, and 21.2% were non-families. 17.2% of all households were made up of individuals, and 5.5% had someone living alone who was 65 years of age or older.  The average household size was 2.77 and the average family size was 3.09.

In the township the population was spread out, with 27.9% under the age of 18, 7.1% from 18 to 24, 29.5% from 25 to 44, 25.1% from 45 to 64, and 10.4% who were 65 years of age or older.  The median age was 37 years. For every 100 females, there were 102.9 males.  For every 100 females age 18 and over, there were 102.3 males.

The median income for a household in the township was $50,566, and the median income for a family was $53,380. Males had a median income of $39,919 versus $28,173 for females. The per capita income for the township was $20,223.  About 3.2% of families and 5.4% of the population were below the poverty line, including 4.1% of those under age 18 and 9.6% of those age 65 or over.

References

Notes

Sources

Townships in Montcalm County, Michigan
Charter townships in Michigan
1850 establishments in Michigan
Populated places established in 1850